The Sheffield City Battalion was a Pals battalion during the First World War .

Raised in 1914, it was designated as the 12th (Sheffield City) (Service) Battalion, York and Lancaster Regiment.

History

Recruits 
The battalion found its recruits came from all walks of life; from £500 a year businessmen and stockbrokers to shop assistants and clerks. The post-war music hall performer Stainless Stephen was a member. By 5 December 1914, there were 1,131 officers and men in the battalion. It was brigaded in the 94th Brigade of the 31st Division alongside the 1st and 2nd Barnsley Pals from the Yorks and Lancs and the Accrington Pals from the East Lancashire Regiment .

The Destroying 
The 31st Division had been assigned to the defence of the Suez Canal but after arriving there it was sent back to France where it found itself in the line opposite the fortified town of Serre in April 1916.

For the Somme offensive, the Sheffield City battalion would have the dubious honour of being on the extreme left of the 15-mile British front. On 1 July, at 7.20 am, the battalion moved into No Man's Land while the German lines were mortared. The Germans responded with a counter-barrage while the second waves were coming out of the trenches.

At 7.30 am the bombardment stopped and the four waves of the battalion rose and advanced into a devastating hail of machinegun bullets and artillery fire. They were caught in machinegun fire from their exposed left and their front. The third and fourth waves were cut in half before they even reached No-Mans land. A few survivors made it to the German wire (uncut) and on the right wing some even found their way into the German front line. Few of these were able to return. Corporal Outram, a signaller, recalled that; "as far as the eye could see, the last two men left standing on the battlefield were himself and another signaller, A. Brammer. They signalled to each other. Outram turned his head for a moment, and when he looked back Brammer had gone."
The remnants of the battalion were taken out of the line on the evening of 3 July, having lost 513 officers and men killed, wounded or missing; a further 75 were slightly wounded.

Serre would remain uncaptured until the German withdrawal to the Hindenburg Line in 1917. The Pals character of the battalion would never be regained, losing many more casualties before the end of the Somme campaign. By the early weeks of 1918' the greatly weakened battalion was disbanded.

References 

Pals battalions
Military units and formations established in 1914
Military units and formations disestablished in 1918
History of Sheffield
Military history of Yorkshire
1914 establishments in the United Kingdom